The 1981–82 English League North season was the fourth and last season of the English League North, the top level ice hockey league in northern England. Nine teams participated in the league, and the Blackpool Seagulls won the championship. The games played by the London All-Stars were counted double. (One win/loss is equivalent to two wins/losses.)

Regular season

External links
 Season on hockeyarchives.info

English
English League North seasons